Michael Gabriel Sullivan (born January 8, 1995) is an American soccer player who plays as a midfielder.

Career
Sullivan had committed to play college soccer at California Polytechnic State University in 2013, but instead opted to go professional. Sullivan spent time trialling around Europe, as well as stints with Fluminense in Brazil, and Gyirmót in Hungary.

In August 2019, Sullivan signed for NISA side California United Strikers ahead of the league's inaugural season.

References

External links
 California United profile

1995 births
Living people
American soccer players
American expatriate soccer players
Association football midfielders
Soccer players from California
Gyirmót FC Győr players
National Independent Soccer Association players
People from Stanford, California
Sportspeople from Santa Clara County, California
American expatriate sportspeople in Hungary
Expatriate footballers in Hungary
De Anza Force players